Confederate Memorial Chapel is a historic interdenominational memorial chapel located in Richmond, Virginia.  It was built in 1887, and is a white frame, Gothic Revival style structure with a clipped gable roof of grey tin and a belfry. It features eight commemorative stained glass windows all dating from the 19th century and dedicated to the soldiers and/or battalions of the Confederacy.

It was listed on the National Register of Historic Places in 1972.

References

Properties of religious function on the National Register of Historic Places in Virginia
Carpenter Gothic church buildings in Virginia
Churches completed in 1887
Churches in Richmond, Virginia
National Register of Historic Places in Richmond, Virginia
Chapels in Richmond, Virginia